The 2017 ABL Playoffs is the postseason tournament concluding the 2016–17 ABL season of the ASEAN Basketball League (ABL). The top four teams that had the best regular season records qualified. The semifinals are a best-of-three series, while the Finals is a best-of-five series. The higher-seed team holds the home court advantage, hosting Games 1 and 3 in the semifinals, and Games 1, 2 and 5 in the Finals.

The Eastern Sports Club and Alab Pilipinas qualified to the playoffs in their first year in the league. Last season's losing finalists, the Singapore Slingers, and the Saigon Heat, also qualified. Defending champions Westports Malaysia Dragons missed the playoffs for the first time in league history.

The best team from the Southeast Asia Basketball Association (SEABA) qualify for the 2017 FIBA Asia Champions Cup as SEABA's representative. As the Singapore Slingers are the only SEABA team in the Finals, they will be taking SEABA's berth; Hong Kong Eastern are from the East Asia Basketball Association.

Bracket

Semifinals

Eastern vs. Saigon

Singapore vs. Alab

Finals 
All times are local (UTC+08:00)

References

2016–17 ABL season
ASEAN Basketball League playoffs